Gauss's Theorema Egregium (Latin for "Remarkable Theorem") is a major result of differential geometry, proved by Carl Friedrich Gauss in 1827, that concerns the curvature of surfaces.  The theorem says that Gaussian curvature can be determined entirely by measuring angles, distances and their rates on a surface, without reference to the particular manner in which the surface is embedded in the ambient 3-dimensional Euclidean space.  In other words, the Gaussian curvature of a surface does not change if one bends the surface without stretching it.  Thus the Gaussian curvature is an intrinsic invariant of a surface.

Gauss presented the theorem in this manner (translated from Latin):

Thus the formula of the preceding article leads itself to the remarkable Theorem. If a curved surface is developed upon any other surface whatever, the measure of curvature in each point remains unchanged.

The theorem is "remarkable" because the starting definition of Gaussian curvature makes direct use of position of the surface in space. So it is quite surprising that the result does not depend on its embedding in spite of all bending and twisting deformations undergone.

In modern mathematical terminology, the theorem may be stated as follows:

Elementary applications 

A sphere of radius R has constant Gaussian curvature which is equal to 1/R2. At the same time, a plane has zero Gaussian curvature. As a corollary of Theorema Egregium, a piece of paper cannot be bent onto a sphere without crumpling. Conversely, the surface of a sphere cannot be unfolded onto a flat plane without distorting the distances. If one were to step on an empty egg shell, its edges have to split in expansion before being flattened. Mathematically, a sphere and a plane are not isometric, even locally. This fact is significant for cartography: it implies that no planar (flat) map of Earth can be perfect, even for a portion of the Earth's surface. Thus every cartographic projection necessarily distorts at least some distances.

The catenoid and the helicoid are two very different-looking surfaces. Nevertheless, each of them can be continuously bent into the other: they are locally isometric. It follows from Theorema Egregium that under this bending the Gaussian curvature at any two corresponding points of the catenoid and helicoid is always the same. Thus isometry is simply bending and twisting of a surface without internal crumpling or tearing, in other words without extra tension, compression, or shear.

An application of the theorem is seen when a flat object is somewhat folded or bent along a line, creating rigidity in the perpendicular direction.  This is of practical use in construction, as well as in a common pizza-eating strategy: A flat slice of pizza can be seen as a surface with constant Gaussian curvature 0. Gently bending a slice must then roughly maintain this curvature (assuming the bend is roughly a local isometry). If one bends a slice horizontally along a radius, non-zero principal curvatures are created along the bend, dictating that the other principal curvature at these points must be zero. This creates rigidity in the direction perpendicular to the fold, an attribute desirable for eating pizza, as it holds its shape long enough to be consumed without a mess. This same principle is used for strengthening in corrugated materials, most familiarly corrugated fiberboard and corrugated galvanised iron, and in some forms of potato chips.

See also
 Second fundamental form
 Gaussian curvature
 Differential geometry of surfaces
 Carl Friedrich Gauss#Theorema Egregium

Notes

References

External links
 Theorema Egregium on Mathworld

Differential geometry
Differential geometry of surfaces
Riemannian geometry
Surfaces
Theorems in geometry
Carl Friedrich Gauss